Arab Media Watch is a London-based media watchdog organisation with the stated aim of working toward objective British media coverage of the Arab world. Founded in 2000, by Sharif Hikmat Nashashibi, Arab Media Watch is the "only organisation of its kind in the UK". The organisation monitors coverage of the Arab world  in UK based print and broadcast media.  Victor Kattan, author of  Why History Matters: International Law and the Origins of the Arab-Israeli Conflict, formerly served as the director of Arab Media Watch, that post is now filled by Muna Nashashibi.

External links
 Organization web site 
 Entry in UK Social Sciences organization database
 "The battle for public relations", from The Economist, Mar 23rd 2005

2000 establishments in the United Kingdom
Media analysis organizations and websites
Non-governmental organizations involved in the Israeli–Palestinian conflict
Organizations established in 2000
Non-profit organisations based in the United Kingdom